Bolbena minutissima is a species of praying mantis in the family Nanomantidae.

See also
List of mantis genera and species
Praying mantis

References

Mantodea of Africa
Bolbena
Insects described in 1908